The Battle of Carham (c. 1018) was fought between the Kingdom of Scotland and the Northumbrians at Carham on Tweed. Uhtred, son of Waltheof of Bamburgh (or his brother Eadwulf), fought the combined forces of Malcolm II of Scotland and Owen the Bald (King of Strathclyde). Their combined forces defeated Earl Uhtred's forces, determining the eastern border of Scotland at the River Tweed.

Written records of the battle 
Sources for the battle are scarce. Those that do mention the battle often include it in a survey of other events. The Anglo-Saxon Chronicle does not mention it.

King Malcolm and Owen grouped together "near Caddonlea (Selkirkshire) […] where the Wedale road from Alba met the Tweeddale road from Strathclyde, lay at the northern edge of Ettrick Forest (roughly corresponding to Selkirkshire in extent) which formed a march between Cumbria and Northumbria." Uhtred's forces intercepted them before they crossed Cheviot. This interception meant that he did not have enough time to gather enough troops. Another source, De obsessione Dunelmi ("On the Siege of Durham"), places the battle under the 1018 annal listing Uhtred as the Northumbrian army.

Dating controversy 
Symeon of Durham (12th Century), using dependable Northumbrian materials, located the year of the battle in 1018 ("without mention of Uhtred") in the Historia Dunelmensis Ecclesie. His record of a comet's visibility 30 days before the battle correlates with astronomical evidence from August 1018. Stenton mentions the comet but dismisses it on the grounds that the Anglo-Saxon Chronicle dates the death of Earl Uhtred to 1016.

Stenton and C. Plummer argue that the earlier date of the battle used the 1016 annal's inclusion of Uhtred's death. Duncan argues and Woolf supports that the mention is an aside from the scribe recording in 1018 or 1019. De Obsessione Dunelmi (c. 1165) supports Duncan's theory that the Anglo-Saxon Chronicle scribe is discussing the more recent death of Uhtred as it places his death following the events outlined in the English source under the 1018 annal. Woolf argues that 1018 is more likely and that the Northumbrian leader was most likely Uhtred but just possible his brother Eadwulf.

Significance 
The battle's significance is a matter of controversy, especially in regard to the region of Lothian. Scottish historians claim Lothian was won for Scotland at Carham and that Scotland's borders were expanded as a result; Marjorie O. Anderson argues that the English king Edgar the Peaceful granted Lothian to Kenneth II of Scotland, King of Scots, in 973. In English sources, the Battle of Carham is not given any special significance. Still others, such as G.W.S. Barrow hold, that "What English annalists recorded as the 'cession' of Lothian was... the recognition by a powerful but extremely remote south-country king of a long-standing fait accompli."

The Scots' possession of what now constitutes the south-east of Scotland seems to have been recognized by kings of England, even when kings such as Cnut and William the Conqueror invaded, as they did not seek permanent control of the area.

Aftermath 
After the battle of Carham, much of present-day Scotland was under the control of the King of Scots, although Norsemen still held sway in Ross, Caithness, Sutherland, and The Isles. The Lords of Galloway remained semi-independent. Scotland or Scotia referred to what constitutes present-day Scotland north of the Forth and Clyde; it was not until the time of King David I of Scotland, citizens in the south-east of the kingdom began to think of themselves as Scots. In his own charters (e.g. to St Cuthbert's in Edinburgh), he continued to refer to the men of Lothian as English. Woolf asserts that "the likelihood is that these are under representative glimpses of a much longer conflict which escaped the detailed gaze of our chroniclers because far more interesting things were happening in Southumbria and Ireland at the time."

Carham 1018 Society 
The society's mission statement is "to investigate, raise awareness, and commemorate the Battle of Carham." The society's website provides dates for "public meetings, commemorative events, and future plans" as well as excerpts from articles and archaeological findings pertaining to the battle.

References

References 
 Anderson, M.O. (1980). Kings and Kingship in Early Scotland. Scottish Academic Press.
 Carham Society of 1018 (2015)
 De obsessione Dunelmi et de probitate Uhtredi comitis, et de comitibus qui ei successerunt ("On the siege of Durham, and the character of Earl Uhtred, and the earls who succeeded him"), C. J. Morris. (1992) in Marriage and Murder in 11th Century Northumbria: A Study of De Obsessione Dunelmi. University of York. 
 Duncan, A.A.M., "The Battle of Carham, 1018" The Scottish Historical Review, Vol. 55, No. 159, 1976
 Mack, Logan, (1924) "The Border Line - Solway Firth to the North Sea", Oliver & Boyd. 
 Plummer, C. Two of the Saxon Chronicles Parallel, Oxford, 1892.
 Stenton, Frank (1971). Anglo-Saxon England, 3rd ed. Oxford UP.

 Woolf, A. (2007) The New Edinburgh History of Scotland Vol. 2: From Pictland To Alba 789-1070, Edinburgh UP.

Further reading
 Daly, Rannoch (2018). Birth of the Border: The Battle of Carham 1018 AD. Alnwick: Wanney Books. 
 

11th century in Scotland
Battles involving Northumbria
Battles involving England
Battles involving Denmark
Battles involving Scotland
1018 in England
Conflicts in 1018
1018 in Scotland